Saadatabad-e Golshan (also Romanized as Sa‘ādatābād-e Golshan; also known as Sa‘ādatābād) is a village in Azizabad Rural District, in the Central District of Narmashir County, Kerman Province, Iran. At the 2006 census, its population was 594, in 120 families.

References 

Populated places in Narmashir County